Trey Cunningham (born August 26, 1998) is an American hurdler who specializes in the 110 metres hurdles. He was a silver medalist in the 110 metres hurdles at the 2022 World Athletics Championships after finishing second at the 2022 USA Outdoor Track and Field Championships. He also won the same event at the 2022 NCAA Division I Outdoor Track and Field Championships, having run the second fastest time in NCAA history in 13.00 seconds.

Statistics
Information from World Athletics profile unless otherwise noted.

Personal bests

International championship results

National championship results
 = personal best
 = seasonal best
 = world lead, fastest time in the world in a calendar year
 = national (American) record

Circuit wins
World Indoor Tour Gold (60 m hurdles)
Overall winner: 
Diamond League (110 m hurdles)
Overall winner: 
European Athletic Association (110 m hurdles)
Meeting Città di Padova: 2022

References

External links 
 
 
 Trey Cunningham bio
 Trey Cunningham High School results

1998 births
Living people
American male sprinters
American male hurdlers
Florida State University alumni
Florida State Seminoles men's track and field athletes
Track and field athletes from Alabama